Dissension  may refer to:

 Expression of dissent
 Strong disagreement
 Dissension (Magic: The Gathering), an expansion set of the collectible card game

See also
 Distension (disambiguation)